Father Goriot (French: Le père Goriot) is a 1945 French historical drama film directed by Robert Vernay and starring Pierre Renoir, Claude Génia and Lise Delamare. It is an adaptation of the 1835 novel of the same title by Honoré de Balzac. It was shot in 1944 but not released until the following year. The film was shot at the Cité Elgé in Paris. The film's sets were designed by the art director René Renoux.

Cast
 Pierre Renoir as Vautrin
 Claude Génia as 	Delphine de Nucingen
 Lise Delamare as 	Madame de Beauséant
 Pierre Larquey as 	Le père Goriot
 Georges Rollin as 	Eugène de Rastignac
 Sylvie as Mademoiselle Michonneau
 Léonce Corne as Le baron de Nucingen
 Maurice Escande as 	Monsieur de Restaud
 Jean Desailly as Bianchon
 Raymond Rognoni as 	Poiret
 Cécilia Paroldi as 	Victorine
 Made Siamé as 	Mademoiselle Couture
 Denise Nast as Sylvie
 Marcel Delaître as Le policier
 Henri Coutet as 	Christophe 
 Pierre Vernet as 	Maxime de Trailles 
François Viguier as 	Gobseck 
 Marcelle Praince as 	Madame Vauquer
 Suzet Maïs as 	Anastasie de Restaud

References

Bibliography
 Heathcote, Owen & Watts, Andrew. The Cambridge Companion to Balzac. Cambridge University Press, 2017.
Oscherwitz,  Dayna & Higgins, MaryEllen. The A to Z of French Cinema. Scarecrow Press, 2009.

External links 
 

1945 films
1940s French-language films
1945 drama films
1940s historical drama films
French historical drama films
Films directed by Robert Vernay
Films set in the 1830s
Films based on French novels
Films based on works by Honoré de Balzac
1940s French films